Mårum railway station is a railway station located in the northern part of the Gribskov forest, about  east of the village of Mårum in North Zealand, Denmark.

Mårum railway station is located on the Gribskov Line from Hillerød to Gilleleje. The train services are operated by the railway company Lokaltog which runs frequent local train services between Hillerød station and Gilleleje station.

See also
 List of railway stations in Denmark

References

External links

 Lokaltog
 Gribskovbanen on jernbanen.dk

Railway stations in the Capital Region of Denmark
Buildings and structures in Gribskov Municipality
Railway stations opened in 1880
1880 establishments in Denmark
Railway stations in Denmark opened in the 19th century